James Bond is a fictional character created by the novelist Ian Fleming in 1953. Bond is a British secret agent working for MI6 who also answers to his codename, ”007“.  He has been portrayed on film by the actors Sean Connery, David Niven, George Lazenby, Roger Moore, Timothy Dalton, Pierce Brosnan and Daniel Craig, in twenty-seven productions. All the films but two were made by Eon Productions. Eon now holds the full adaptation rights to all of Fleming's Bond novels.

The films have won six Academy Awards: to Norman Wanstall for Sound Effects (now Sound Editing) in Goldfinger (at the 37th Awards), to John Stears for Special Visual Effects in Thunderball (at the 38th Awards), to Per Hallberg and Karen Baker Landers for Sound Editing, to Adele and Paul Epworth for Original Song in Skyfall (at the 85th Awards), to Sam Smith and Jimmy Napes for Original Song in Spectre (at the 88th Awards), and to Billie Eillish and Finneas O'Connell for Original Song in No Time To Die (at the 94th Awards). Additionally, several of the songs produced for the films have been nominated for Academy Awards for Original Song, including Paul McCartney's "Live and Let Die", Carly Simon's "Nobody Does It Better" and Sheena Easton's "For Your Eyes Only". In 1982 Albert R. Broccoli received the Irving G. Thalberg Memorial Award.

In 2013, Skyfall won a BAFTA Award for Best British Film and became the first James Bond film to receive a BAFTA Award in this category.

For the music to The Spy Who Loved Me, Marvin Hamlisch received Academy, Golden Globe and Grammy nominations but lost all to John Williams for his work for Star Wars: Episode IV – A New Hope.

Academy Awards

Golden Globe Awards

BAFTA Awards

Grammy Awards

Saturn Awards

Note

References

Sources

External links 

 
 
 
 
 
 
 
 
 
 
 
 
 
 
 
 
 
 
 
 
 
 
 
 
 
 
 

List of awards and nominations
Lists of accolades by film series
Lists of accolades by franchises